Saint Vicinius or Saint Vicinius of Sarsina (died 330) was the first bishop of Sarsina and is venerated as a Roman Catholic saint.

Hagiography 

Vicinius's life is based on notes in an anonymous manuscript lectionary of the 12th century.

Vicinius, traditionally the first bishop of Sarsina, is supposed to have been a native of Liguria. Shortly before the great persecutions of Diocletian and Maximinus II, he withdrew as a hermit to a mountain about six kilometres from Sarsina which is now named after him (Monte San Vicinio, in the present commune of Mercato Saraceno). Here he followed a life of prayer and penitence. While the priests and people of Sarsina were assembled to choose a bishop, a divine sign appeared over the mountain top. In this way the solitary Vicinius was appointed bishop, from the beginning of the fourth century (about 303) to his death in 330.

Even after his election Vicinius periodically withdrew to the mountains in solitary retreat.

The Collar of Saint Vicinius
During his life he had a reputation as a miracle-worker, with a particular ability to expel demons and to heal the faithful of physical and mental illness by means of an iron chain or collar weighted with a stone which he wore round his neck as a penance, in the form of two arms joined by a double clasp and terminating in two interlocking rings. According to a scientific study carried out by the University of Bologna, the collar, of uncertain origin, is either contemporary with or slightly earlier than the life of the saint. Today the collar is used for blessings. It is said to be the hand of the saint who by his powerful intercession with God gives grace to all those who make pilgrimage to his altar. The exorcisms are carried out inside the basilica of San Vicinio (the former Sarsina Cathedral) by priests specially authorised by the bishop

Cult
In Sarsina Cathedral is the Chapel of Saint Vicinius. Here are kept the saint's relics and the miraculous collar, the reputation of which still brings pilgrims seeking the saint's aid in healing illness and possession.

The feast of Saint Vicinius is celebrated on 28 August.

Notes

Sources
 Vita s. Vicinii episcopi Sassinatis, (Lectionarium, Biblioteca Gambalunga di Rimini, ms. 4.A.1.1.)
 La prima vita di san Vicinio vescovo di Sarsina, introduzione e testo a cura di G. Lucchesi; traduzione di A. Zini e W. Ferretti, Faenza 1973
 Vita di Vicinio, a cura di Marino Mengozzi, (Vite dei santi dell'Emilia Romagna; 2), Cesena 2003,

Further reading
 Mons. Luigi Testi, San Vicinio: vescovo e protettore principale della citta e diocesi sarsinate, nella storia e tradizione con la serie cronologica dei vescovi di Sarsina, Modena 1906 (rist. 1926)
 Ettore Fabbri, San Vicinio, vescovo e protettore dei sarsinati, Sarsina 1955
 Vicinio Caminati, S. Vicinio primo vescovo di Sarsina, Sarsina 1970
 Carlo Dolcini, La vita di san Vicinio; I diplomi imperiali e papali di Sarsina, 1 (1027?-1220), in Ecclesia S. Vicinii: per una storia della Diocesi di Sarsina, Cesena 1991, pp. 4–66
 Paolo Zanfini, Vita et miracoli del glorioso confessore S. Vicinio vescovo, et protettore di Sarsina, Sarsina 1609, in "Studi Romagnoli", 59 (2008), pp. 119–127

External links 
 Santibeati: San Vicinio di Sarsina 
 Il Cammino di San Vicinio della Comunità Montana Sarsinate 

Bishops in Emilia-Romagna
4th-century Christian saints
Saints from Roman Italy
330 deaths
Year of birth unknown